The 2001 LG Chinese Football Super Cup (Chinese: LG杯2001年度中国足球超霸杯赛) was the 7th Chinese Football Super Cup, contested by Chinese Jia-A League 2001 and 2001 Chinese FA Cup double winners Dalian Shide and Chinese Jia-A League 2001 runners-up Shanghai Shenhua. Shanghai Shenhua won their 3rd title after winning 3–1 on aggregate.

Match details

First leg

Second leg

References 

2001 in Chinese football
2001